John Sewell (23 April 1882, Half Morton, Dumfriesshire – 18 July 1947) was a Scottish tug of war competitor who competed for Great Britain and Ireland in the 1912 Summer Olympics and in the 1920 Summer Olympics.

In 1912 he won the silver medal as part of the joint Metropolitan Police and City of London Police team. Eight years later he won the gold medal as member of the Great Britain team, this time wholly composed of City officers.

References

1882 births
1947 deaths
Sportspeople from Dumfries and Galloway
Scottish male athletes
Scottish Olympic medallists
Olympic tug of war competitors of Great Britain
Tug of war competitors at the 1912 Summer Olympics
Tug of war competitors at the 1920 Summer Olympics
Olympic gold medallists for Great Britain
Olympic silver medallists for Great Britain
Olympic medalists in tug of war
Medalists at the 1920 Summer Olympics
Medalists at the 1912 Summer Olympics
City of London Police officers